The Ankh is the Egyptian hieroglyphic character ☥, meaning "life".

Ankh may also refer to:

People 
 Ankh-ef-en-Khonsu i, an Ancient Egyptian priest of the god Mentu
 Ankh Warrior, a persona of Vinnie Vincent in the band KISS

Art, entertainment, and media

Fictional entities 
 Ankh, a character in Kamen Rider OOO
 Ankh-Morpork, a city in the Discworld novels of Terry Pratchett

Films 
 Ankh Ka Tara, a 1978 Bollywood film

Games 
 Ankh, a series of computer adventure games:
 Ankh (video game) (2005)
 Ankh: Heart of Osiris (2006)
 Ankh: Battle of the Gods (2007)
 Adventurers of the North - Kalevala Heroes (ANKH), a Finnish role-playing game

Other uses 
 ANKH, a protein
 Ankh wedja seneb, an Ancient Egyptian phrase
 AnkhSVN, an add-in for Subversion software

See also 

Anth (disambiguation)
 Akh